Hong Tshun-fu (born 24 January 1940) is a Taiwanese boxer. He competed in the men's welterweight event at the 1964 Summer Olympics. At the 1964 Summer Olympics, he lost to Issake Dabore of Niger.

References

1940 births
Living people
Taiwanese male boxers
Olympic boxers of Taiwan
Boxers at the 1964 Summer Olympics
Place of birth missing (living people)
Welterweight boxers
20th-century Taiwanese people